Eucamptognathus opacus is a species of ground beetle in the subfamily Pterostichinae. It was described by Fairmaire in 1892.

References

Eucamptognathus
Beetles described in 1892